Quasipaa acanthophora is a species of frog in the family Dicroglossidae. It is endemic to northern Vietnam and know from two locations, its type locality Mau Son in the Lang Son Province, and the Tay Yen Tu Nature Reserve in the Bac Giang Province. It is a sibling species of Quasipaa spinosa.

Description
Adult males in the type series measured  and the sole adult female  in snout–vent length (SVL); two females from the Tay Yen Tu Nature Reserve measured  SVL. The head is rather large and wider than it is long. The snout is rounded and slightly protruding. The canthus rostralis is indistinct, as is the tympanum, but the supratympanic fold is prominent. The fingers and toes have no discs, but the toes are fully webbed. Skin on the dorsum is shagreened and has regularly disposed glandular warts. In living specimens, the dorsum is light brown and has grey spots. The supratympanic fold is darker, and the lips bear vertical bars. The limbs have transverse bars on the dorsal surface. The ventrum is yellowish white, and the gular region has black marbling. Males have enlarged forearms and black nuptial spines on prepollex, fingers I–III, and chest.

Habitat and conservation
The ecology of this species is poorly known. The species description was primarily based on specimens collected by René Léon Bourret in 1930s and two additional, older specimens, and no ecological information accompany it. However, expanding human settlements, agriculture, and harvesting (though this species in particular has not been reported as being targeted) are likely threats. One of the populations occurs in a protected area.

References

acanthophora
Endemic fauna of Vietnam
Amphibians of Vietnam
Amphibians described in 2009